Green Dragon is a 2001 American drama film directed by Timothy Linh Bui and starring Patrick Swayze, Forest Whitaker and Duong Don.

Plot
The film follows the experience of Vietnamese refugees in the United States immediately following the Fall of Saigon at the end of the Vietnam War. Tai Tran (Duong) has been appointed the camp translator by Gunnery Sgt. Jim Lance (Swayze). He has arrived with his sister's two young children. Their mother is believed to have been lost in the rush to leave Vietnam.

Despite the despair of leaving Vietnam and having to live in an unfamiliar United States, many of the occupants make adjustments. Minh (Nguyen) is silent and solitary until he meets Addie (Whitaker), the camp's cook. They embark on a friendship to the point where Minh is drawn out of his shell. Meanwhile, Tai and his friend Duc (Tran) find themselves enamored with two female refugees. Tai falls for Thuy Hoa, the daughter of a discredited Vietnamese general. Duc falls back in love with a former girlfriend from Vietnam (Luong) who is an unhappily married second wife.

Cast
There were open casting calls for actors and actresses in Orange County, California and San Jose, California.

Don Duong had been cast in Tony Bui's 1999 acclaimed film Three Seasons as Hai. Impressed by his work in the film, Timothy Bui asked him to play Tai.

Initially, Bui did not want Patrick Swayze for the role of Jim Lance due to fears that his big name would overshadow the story and message of the small film. However, upon meeting Swayze he changed his mind, as Swayze related to Bui his complete understanding of the film.

 Patrick Swayze as Gunnery Sergeant Jim Lance
 Forest Whitaker as Addie
 Don Duong as Tai Tran
 Hiep Thi Le as Thuy Hoa
 Billinjer C. Tran as Duc
 Kathleen Luong as Second Wife
 Trung Nguyen as Minh

Production
The story was written by Bui's younger brother Tony Bui. Both of the brothers came to the United States with their family in 1975, as refugees from Vietnam.

The setting of the film is Camp Pendleton in Southern California, where the movie was also filmed.

Reaction
Green Dragon held its premiere on January 19, 2001 at the Sundance Film Festival where it was nominated for the Grand Jury Prize.

Reviews
The film received primarily positive reviews although many contended that the film was so sentimental that details were lost. In The New York Times, film critic Dave Kehr wrote that the film was, "not a pernicious film, but simply one that tugs too tenaciously at the heartstrings." Variety praised the actors, "Swayze and Whitaker are effective without especially stretching their acting range, while Duong, who co-starred with Harvey Keitel in "Three Seasons," brings solemn understatement and warmth that serve his role well." However, they criticized the film for its director who "zeros in too unrelentingly on the innocent faces of the two children, the development of the Addie/Minh bond feels calculatedly heartwarming and dialogue too often sounds agenda-driven."

Awards and nominations
Austin Film Festival
2001: Won, "Best Advance Screening" - Tony Bui & Timothy Linh Bui

Humanitas Prize
2001: Won, "Best Film" - Timothy Linh Bui & Tony Bui

Political Film Society
2003: Nominated, "PFS Award for Exposé"

Sundance Film Festival
2001: Nominated, "Grand Jury Prize for Best Dramatic Film" - Timothy Linh Bui

Young Artist Award 
2003: Nominated, "Best Performance in a Feature Film By a Young Actor Age Ten & Under" - Trung Nguyen

References

External links
 
 

2001 films
2001 drama films
American drama films
Vietnamese-language films
Vietnam War films
Films about Vietnamese Americans
Franchise Pictures films
Columbia Pictures films
Films scored by Mychael Danna
Films scored by Jeff Danna
Films produced by Elie Samaha
2000s English-language films
2000s American films